John Howard FRS (2 September 1726 – 20 January 1790) was a philanthropist and early English prison reformer.

Birth and early life

Howard was born in North London, either in Hackney or Enfield. His father, also John, was a wealthy upholsterer at Smithfield Market in the city. His mother Ann Pettitt, or Cholmley, died when he was five years old, and, described as a "sickly child", he was sent to live at Cardington, Bedfordshire, some fifty miles from London, where his father owned property. His father, a strict disciplinarian with strong religious beliefs, sent the young John to a school in Hertford run by John Worsley. He went on from there to a dissenting academy run in London by John Eames.

After school, John was apprenticed to a wholesale grocer to learn business methods, but he was unhappy. When his father died in 1742, he was left with a sizeable inheritance but no true vocation, a Calvinist faith and a quiet, serious disposition.

Early travels
In 1748, Howard left England for a grand tour of the continent. On his return, he lived in lodgings in Stoke Newington, where he again became seriously ill. He was nursed back to health by his landlady, Sarah Loidore, whom he then married despite her being 30 years older than he was. She died within three years.

Howard then set out for Portugal following the 1755 Lisbon earthquake, travelling on the Hanover, which was captured by French privateers. He was imprisoned in Brest for six days before being transferred to another prison on the French coast. He was later exchanged for a French officer held by the British, and went to the Commissioners of Sick and Wounded Seamen in London to seek help on behalf of his fellow captives. It is widely believed that this personal experience generated Howard's interest in prisons.

At Cardington
Having returned from France, he settled again at Cardington, Bedfordshire to live on a  estate which was formerly two farms, the larger of which he had inherited from his grandparents. His grandmother, Martha Howard, was a relation of the Whitbread family, and he became a neighbour and close friend of his cousin, Samuel Whitbread. He spent the next two years building properties and trying to improve the lives of the tenants living on his land. Later, a survey of Cardington in 1782 found that he was paying for the teaching of 23 children. He was elected a Fellow of the Royal Society in May 1756.

Prison visitor

John Howard was appointed High Sheriff of Bedfordshire in 1773, initially for a one-year period. Rather than delegating his duties to the under-sheriff as was customary, Howard inspected the county prison himself. He was shocked by what he found, and spurred into action to inspect prisons throughout England. Of particular concern to Howard were those prisoners who were held because they could not pay the jailer's fee – an amount paid to the owner or keeper of the prison for upkeep. He took this issue to parliament, and in 1774 was called to give evidence on prison conditions to a House of Commons select committee. Unusually, Howard was called to the bar of the House of Commons and publicly thanked for his "humanity and zeal".

Having visited several hundred prisons across England, Scotland, Wales and wider Europe, Howard published the first edition of The State of the Prisons in 1777. It included very detailed accounts of the prisons he had visited, including plans and maps, together with detailed instructions on the necessary improvements, especially regarding hygiene and cleanliness, the lack of which was causing many deaths. It is this work that has been credited as establishing the practice of single-celling in the United Kingdom and, by extension, in the United States. Howard's views on keeping prisoners in isolation were later unavailingly opposed by Elizabeth Fry, who believed in the value of association. The following account, of the Bridewell at Abingdon, Oxfordshire, is typical:

Two dirty day-rooms; and three offensive night-rooms: That for men eight feet square: one of the women's, nine by eight; the other four and a half feet square: the straw, worn to dust, swarmed with vermin: no court: no water accessible to prisoners. The petty offenders were in irons: at my last visit, eight were women.

Howard viewed his work as humanitarian. Terry Carlson, in his 1990 biographical tract on Howard, remarks:

Howard's detailed proposals for improvements were designed to enhance the physical and mental health of the prisoners and the security and order of the prison. His recommendations pertaining to such matters as the prison location, plan and furnishings, the provision of adequate water supply, and prisoner's diet promoted hygiene and physical health. Recommendations concerning the quality of prison personnel, rules related to the maintenance of standards of health and order and an independent system of inspection, reflect the need for prison personnel to set a moral example.

In April 1777, Howard's sister died, leaving him £15,000 and her house. He used this inheritance and the revenue from the sale of her house to further his work on prisons. In 1778, he was again examined by the House of Commons, who were this time inquiring into "hulks", or prison ships. Two days after giving evidence, he was again travelling Europe, beginning in the Dutch Republic.

By 1784, Howard calculated that he had travelled over  visiting prisons. He had been awarded an honorary LLD by the University of Dublin and had been given the Freedom of the City of London. His fourth and final tour of English prisons began in March 1787 and two years later he published The State of the Prisons in England, and An Account of the Principal Lazarettos of Europe.

Death

Howard's final journey took him into Eastern Europe, and to Crimea. Whilst at Kherson, he contracted typhus on a prison visit, and died, aged 63. He was buried in a walled field at Dophinovka (Stepanovka),  to the north. Despite his request for a quiet funeral, the event was elaborate and attended by Emanuel Giani Ruset, the Prince of Moldavia, Nikolay Mordvinov, and Admiral John Priestman in the Russian service.

When news of his death reached England in February 1790, a commemorative series of John Howard halfpenny Conder Tokens were struck, including one that circulated in Bath, on the reverse showing "Go forth" and "Remember the Debtors in Gaol".

John Howard was considered eccentric by many of his contemporaries. It has been advanced by psychiatrist Philip Lucas and by mathematician Ioan Mackenzie James that Howard might have had Asperger's Syndrome.

Family
In 1758, Howard married as his second wife Henrietta Leeds, daughter of Edward Leeds (died 1758), a barrister. She died in 1765, a week after giving birth to a son, also named John, who was sent to boarding school at a very young age. The younger John was sent down from Cambridge for homosexual offences, was judged insane at the age of 21, and died in 1799 having spent thirteen years in an asylum.

Awards and honours
Howard became the first civilian to be honoured with a statue in St. Paul's Cathedral, London. A statue was also erected in Bedford, and a further one in a John Haviland-designed monument in Kherson. His bust features in the architecture of a number of Victorian prisons across the UK, such as at Shrewsbury. He was elected a Foreign Honorary Member of the American Academy of Arts and Sciences in 1790.

Legacy

Organisations
Almost eighty years after his death, the Howard Association was formed in London, with the aim of "promotion of the most efficient means of penal treatment and crime prevention" and to promote "a reformatory and radically preventive treatment of offenders". In its first annual report in 1867, the Association stated that its efforts had been focused on "the promotion of reformatory and remunerative prison labour, and the abolition of capital punishment." The Association merged with the Penal Reform League in 1921 to become the Howard League for Penal Reform. Today, the Howard League is Britain's biggest penal reform organisation.

John Howard's name was adopted by non-profit organizations in Canada which call themselves the John Howard Society of their given geographic area and each society seeks to develop effective, just and humane responses to crime and its consequences. There are currently over 60 John Howard societies spread across every province of Canada and the Northwest Territories.

The Howard Association, a benevolent organisation founded in 1855 in Norfolk, Virginia, United States, was also named after him. There is also a Howard League for Penal Reform in New Zealand. The John Howard Association of Illinois, formed in 1901, independently monitors correctional facilities, policies and practices, and advances reforms needed to achieve a fair, humane and effective criminal justice system in Illinois.

Samford University, located in the US state of Alabama, was founded by Baptists as Howard College in 1841. Samford's Howard College of Arts and Sciences remains part of the university.

Other
 A statue to Howard is in St Paul's Cathedral, the first to a civilian, and a large bronze statue at Bedford was erected in 1890, the centenary of his death.
 A terracotta bust of John Howard is incorporated in the gatehouse of HM Prison Wormwood Scrubs, and another bust over the entrance to Shrewsbury Prison.
 The John Howard Pavilion at St. Elizabeths Hospital in Washington, D.C., is the Forensic Psychiatric Hospital for the District of Columbia. Its most notorious inmate was John Hinckley, Jr., failed assassin of then US president Ronald Wilson Reagan in 1981.
 The John Howard School in Clapton, London (now Clapton Girls' Academy), was named after him.

Vegetarianism

Howard was a teetotaller and vegetarian. He became a vegetarian many years before his death. He once commented that in his London house there were "not a dozen joints of meat in seven years." He lived on a diet of milk, fruit, vegetables, butter, tea and water. As a strict vegetarian Howard had distaste for the luxuries of life. He was fond of tea and carried a kettle on his travels.

Whilst visiting Sweden, Howard found that living on a vegetarian diet was very difficult. This was because few vegetables were eaten in the winter months, and they were almost impossible to obtain. His diet was limited to coarse bread. He attributed his immunity from gaol fever found in filthy prisons that he had visited to his vegetarian diet.

See also
 Morrin Centre
 Penitentiary Act
 Sir Robert Peel

Notes

References 
John Howard – by the Howard League for Penal Reform

Further reading
 Philip Lucas, "John Howard and Asperger's Syndrome: Psychopathology and philanthropy" in: History of Psychiatry 12(45) March 2001, pp. 73–101.
 Farrar, Mrs. John. John Howard, (1833)
 Aikin, John. A view of the life, travels, and philanthropic labors of the late John Howard, (1794). From the Digital Collections of the National Library of Medicine
 Peter Bayne, 1890, Men Worthy to Lead; Being Lives of John Howard, William Wilberforce, Thomas Chalmers, Thomas Arnold, Samuel Budgett, John Foster, London: Simpkin, Marshall, Hamilton, Kent & Co. Ltd, Reprinted: Bibliolife, .

External links

 Howard League for Penal Reform (England & Wales)
 Howard League for Penal Reform (Scotland)
 Howard League for Penal Reform (New Zealand)
 John Howard Society of Canada
 The Ethics of Diet: John Howard
 An account of the principal lazarettos in Europe, of 1789, in the National Library of Portugal

 
 

1726 births
1790 deaths
18th-century philanthropists
British social reformers
British vegetarianism activists
English reformers
English Calvinist and Reformed Christians
English philanthropists
Fellows of the American Academy of Arts and Sciences
Fellows of the Royal Society
High Sheriffs of Bedfordshire
People from Cardington, Bedfordshire
People from Lower Clapton
Penal system in the United Kingdom
Penologists
Prison reformers